Ramganj Mandi is a city and a municipality in Kota district in the Indian state of Rajasthan. It is known as stone city, coriander city. It has the largest grain market of coriander with around 6500 tons of coriander seeds arriving on a single day during season. Spices Giant MDH buys its coriander seeds from Ramganj Mandi. A new spice park is being constructed on Nimana road, the link road between SH 9B and NH 12. Annually billions of square feet of limestone is exported throughout the country, mainly in Punjab, Haryana, Chandigarh, Gujarat, Maharashtra and Madhya Pradesh. Around 1000 stone processing units are set up in the industrial area. More than 80 mines are present in the area.

Demographics

 India census, Ramganj Mandi had a population of 41,784. Males constitute 53% of the population and females 47%. Ramganj Mandi has an average literacy rate of 68%, higher than the national average of 59.5%: male literacy is 75%, and female literacy is 60%. In Ramganj Mandi, 16% of the population is under 10 years of age.

169 villages come under sub district Ramganj Mandi. Total population of Ramganj Mandi Sub District is 272,448 of which 142,353 are males and 130,095 are females. Ramganjmandi is a major market for agriculture for Rajasthan and surrounding area of Madhya Pradesh. Its revenue for the state Rajasthan is more than 18 district of Rajasthan. Ramganjmandi is a trading and industrial hub of south east Rajasthan so heavy exchange of transport are always there. Thus without make it a political district it has RTO office RJ33. Most of kota stone mines and producing units is present in this city.

History

City was earlier outskirt of village Khairabad, famous for the temple of Maa Falaudi. People started living around the railway station which was then known as Khairabad road, Suket road.

Later on Princely State of Kota established this as Ramganj Mandi. Maximum people residing here are migrated from different parts of country. Mostly people came here to work and later settled here. Most of the economy is based on stone business and coriander seeds. Now a time it has largest market of coriander in Asia. Second spice park of Rajasthan is also constructed here and Start Eastern Condiments Co. .

Transport

Rail - The city is situated on Delhi-Bombay Railway line, so it is well connected to all major cities via Rail.
City has a railway station Ramganj mandi Junction (starting point of under construction of ramganj Mandi-Bhopal railway line and provide connectivity to Jhalawar district on this route).

Road - City has two bus stands; one near Martyr Pannalal Circle which is only for Rajasthan Roadways Buses, and another near railway station for private bus operators.

Rajasthan State Highway 9 is passing through city to Jhalawar connecting city with National Highway 12. Another State Highway 27 is touching the city which is further going to "Anu Nagari" Rawatbhata via Chechat.

There are many roadway transport services which transport "Kota Stone" and coriander to all parts of India.

Air - Nearest airport is Kota  .

References

 http://www.censusindia.gov.in/pca/SearchDetails.aspx?Id=112942

Cities and towns in Kota district